Irchelpark is the biggest public park in the city of Zürich in Switzerland, and claims to be the most spacious park in Switzerland.

Location 
Irchelpark is situated mainly in Zürich-Unterstrass, a district of the city of Zürich. The area also houses the Irchelpark faculty of the University of Zürich and is one of the largest public parks in Zürich. Public transport is provided by the Zürich Tram routes 7, 9, 10 and 14, as well by the VBZ bus lines 39, 69, 72 and 83 at the Milchbuck hub.

The park is divided by the Winterthurerstrasse respectively by one of the feeders of the A1 motorway in two different sites, bridged by a wide natural stone stair, of which the lower part af the park is partially situated. The upper part houses the university's campus, as well as underground sports, former military (Zivilschutz) and parking facilities, and the structures of the Staatsarchiv Zürich. A further extension of the Staatsarchiv building was approved by the parliament of the Canton of Zürich in March 2016 for the construction of Bau 3 (stage 3) for 25 million Swiss Francs; adjacent to the present building (stage 2), a cafeteria and conference rooms will be built, including a solar power plant. Because the capacities of the Irchel campus of the University of Zürich also are exhausted, an extension was started in mid-April 2016 to be also completed in 2019.

History 
In 1962, the faculty of science of the University of Zürich proposed to several university institutes, to improve the utilization of synergies and cost savings in a campus on the Strickhofareal that is situated at the western slope of the Zürichberg hill. The first stage of the construction works of the university buildings begun in 1973, and the campus was inaugurated in 1979. The construction of the second stage lasted from 1978 to 1983. Among other things, the excavated material of the first and second stage was a problem that was not solved, thus the terrain in the Unterstrass and Oberstrass district was used for landfills. On the basis of the adjusted goals, a competition for the design of a park was started in 1979.

Geography and structure 
As a first step in the lower part of the park was created with the artificial lake that is a separated by a wooden construction serving as pathway and a wide bridge crossing the water. The upper part houses the central axis of the campus towards Frohburgstrasse, where among others a restaurant, a wide meadow, and a scenic outpost overlooking the Limmat Valley are located. The then-new type of integration of gaming activities, a jogging facility, natural playgrounds and fireplaces in the natural areas of the park harbored a certain risk, but were solved within the 1990s. 

Sized to its wide area of hills that protect the park on the streets immissions, the topography creates differentiated landscapes. The individual institute buildings are grouped in the upper park part on both sides of a central pedestrian axis, that is separated by green courtyards. The outer courtyards are interlocked with the surrounding parkland, which are characterized mainly by two reconstructed streams and the observation point on the excavation of the university buildings. The park is free of individual traffic, and the tapping is done entirely underground on both sides of the Winterthurerstrasse. A wide green bridge connects the upper to the lower part of the park and ends in a large staircase made of granite. The lower part of the park is dominated by a large artificial lake and non-urban-like meadows.

As of December 2014, Irchelpark comprises spacious grounds including the spacious lake, and in its natural state, surrounded streams and one separate pond, playground and lawns, seatings and fire pits. Popular is also the sand plant for running and the lookout point, as well as sculptures created by Swiss artists, and the anthropological museum Anthropologisches Museum.

The Irchelpark is in fact a university campus, and therefore in the possession of the Canton of Zürich.

Safety 
In 2010 there have been several cases of physical attack and harassment at Irchelpark after nightfall. Although the safety problem are still not completely resolved, there are no surveillance cameras installed in the park, and the University of Zürich publishes recommendations for the students who at night are using park as access from the campus to the public transport stops.

Literature 

 Gartenbiografien: Orte erzählen. vdf Hochschulverlag AG, ETH Zürich, Zürich 2013, .
 Walter Caflisch: 15 Jahre Parkanlage der Universität Zürich, Universität Zürich, Zürich 2001.

References

External links 

  Grün Stadt Zürich 

Buildings and structures in Zürich
Restaurants in Zürich
University of Zurich
Parks in Zürich
Lakes of Switzerland
Buildings and structures completed in 1986
1986 establishments in Switzerland
Campuses
20th-century architecture in Switzerland